Howard Hugh Watt (1 March 1911 – 17 August 2005) was the last surviving pre-war Springbok and part of the South African rugby team nicknamed "The Invincibles". Nicknamed Sparkle, he was both a cricketer and rugby player.

Early life
Watt was born in Rosebank, Cape Town and educated at Bishops. At school he did not play for the school's first rugby team and in 1928 he went to the United States where he joined a bank and then worked for the Quaker Oats Company in Chicago. While living in Chicago, he became involved in promoting rugby union and cricket in the area.

Cricket career
An Australian cricket team, with a young Don Bradman in the team, toured the US and Canada. Watt, playing for an Illinois XI, bowled Sir Donald Bradman twice in one match in Chicago in 1932 as a fast bowler. When Howard Watt met him again in 1937, Bradman remembered him as one of the few people to dismiss him so cheaply.

In 1934 he returned to South Africa and started playing first-class cricket for Western Province, for whom he opened bowling. He played in six matches for Western Province with a best return of 6–84 for Western Province against Griqualand West in Kimberley in 1934/35. In 1938 he moved to the Transvaal area and played for North Eastern Transvaal. In 1928, Watt played against the England touring team and took 2–59, including the wickets of Len Hutton and Eddie Paynter.

Rugby union career

He was a member of the 1937 Springbok touring team to Australia and New Zealand and although he participated in seven tour games he did not play a test match.

See also
List of South Africa national rugby union players – Springbok no. 260

References

External links
 CricketArchive profile
 Cricinfo profile

1911 births
2005 deaths
South African rugby union players
South Africa international rugby union players
South African cricketers
Western Province cricketers
Northerns cricketers
Western Province (rugby union) players
Golden Lions players
Rugby union players from Cape Town